The A1 motorway, also known as Slovenika, is  long, connecting Šentilj (at the Austrian border) and Koper/Capodistria (on the shores of the Adriatic Sea). It connects several of the largest metropolitan areas of the country, including Maribor, Celje and Ljubljana, all the way to the Slovenian Littoral and port town of Koper.

Construction began in 1970 and the first section was finished in 1972, connecting Vrhnika and Postojna. Everyday operation of this initial stretch started on 29 December 1972.

The connection to Koper was finished on 23 November 2004. The second-to-last part, from Trojane to Blagovica, was opened on 12 August 2005. It was also the most expensive, having eight viaducts and two tunnels despite being only 11 km long. The final section, the eastern Maribor bypass, opened on 14 August 2009.

Route description
The A1 motorway provides connection of Slovenia and Austria (only other motorway with border crossing to Austria being A2 motorway and was from the very start important route, because it connected three largest cities in Slovenia – Ljubljana, Maribor and Celje. On the other hand, it also connected all those cities with Slovenian coast and provided better conditions for transit to Port of Koper. As of 2013 it is also the only motorway that is connected to all the other motorways in Slovenia.

As of 2013 motorway always has at least two traffic lanes in each direction and is rarely without emergency lane. On some parts it has three traffic lanes in one direction and two in another (usually the additional is for slow vehicles). Only Tunnel Golovec has three lanes in each direction. It was also planned that some other parts of highway will get additional lanes but most of plans were postponed due to lack of money.

Toll

Until 1 July 2008 all vehicles had to stop at tollgates and pay a toll. Since that date vignettes are required for all vehicles up to 3.5 tons, while heavier vehicles must still pay the toll at a tollgate. Tollgates are being rearranged so that two traffic lanes for lighter vehicles (with vignettes) are no longer divided by tollgates and vehicles can drive through at 60 kilometres per hour (37 miles per hour). Where tollgates are still standing as they were before 1 July 2008, the speed limit is 40 kilometres per hour (25 miles per hour). Since 2018, heavy vehicles need to pay toll with an electronic on-board unit attached on the windscreen and tollgates are not needed anymore.

There are six toll stations for heavier vehicles Pesnica, Tepanje, Vransko, Kompolje, Log and Videž. For R3 group it ranges from €3.40 to €19.60, together €47.10 at daytime (6 AM-10 PM) and from €3.00 to €17.60, together €42.30 at night (10 PM-6 AM). For R4 group it ranges from €4.90 to €28.30, together €68.20 at daytime (6 AM-10 PM) and from €4.40 to €25.50, together €61.40 at night (10 PM-6 AM).

Notable structures
When most parts of motorway were already done, there came two parts that were something special, meaning tunnels near Trojane with most notable being Tunnel Trojane with length of almost 3 kilometres and thus second longest tunnel in Slovenia (the longest being Karavanke Tunnel) and viaduct Črni Kal, the longest viaduct in Slovenia, being longer than 1 kilometer and also 95 metres high.

Junction list

Tunnels
The motorway includes ten tunnels, two galleries and one covered cut:
 Gallery Dragučova right and left 
 Vodole right , Vodole left 
 Covered cut Malečnik right and left 
 Golo rebro right , Golo rebro left 
 Pletovarje right , Pletovarje left 
 Ločica right , Ločica left 
 Jasovnik right , Jasovnik left 
 Trojane right , Trojane left 
 Podmilj right , Podmilj left 
 Gallery Strmec right and left 
 Golovec right , Golovec left 
 Kastelec right , Kastelec left 
 Dekani right , Dekani left

Bridges

Motorway A1 has 101 viaducts, 109 bridges, 129 overpass in 117 underpass.

Some of the largest viaduct in the A1 (span greater than ):
Kresnica right  and left 
Pekel right  and left 
Preloge right and left 
Škedenj I. right  and left 
Ločica right  and left 
Šentožbolt right  and left 
Petelinjek right  and left 
Blagovica right  and left 
Verd right  and left 
Ravbarkomanda right  and left 
Črni kal right  and left 
Bivje right  and left 

The Črni Kal Viaduct is the longest viaduct in Slovenia.

References

Highways in Slovenia